Replay TV may refer to
ReplayTV, a digital video recorder
Catch up TV, a type of Internet TV